Brachyopa maculipennis is a European species of hoverfly.

Distribution
Austria.

References

Diptera of Europe
Eristalinae
Insects described in 1980
Taxa named by F. Christian Thompson